Wadfradad I (also spelled Autophradates I) was a dynast (frataraka) of Persis in the late 2nd-century BC, ruling from 146 to 138 BC. He was succeeded by Wadfradad II.

References

Sources 
 .
 
 
 
 
 

2nd-century BC Iranian people
History of Fars Province
2nd-century BC rulers in Asia
Zoroastrian rulers
Frataraka rulers of Persis